This is a listing of international branches connected to the major temples of the Dhammakaya tradition, a Thai Buddhist tradition founded in the early 20th century by Luang Pu Sodh Candasaro.

Wat Paknam Bhasicharoen 
Wat Paknam Bhasicharoen (RTGS: Wat Paknam Phasicharoen) is a royal wat ('temple') located in Phasi Charoen district, Bangkok, at the Chao Phraya River. The temple underwent a major change after Luang Pu Sodh Candasaro became abbot, from a temple with only thirteen monks that was nearly abandoned, to a prosperous center of education and meditation practice with five hundred monks (the highest in Thailand at the time) and hundreds of mae chi. It is a large and popular temple, and is the origin of the Dhammakaya tradition.

Below is a list of international branches belonging to Wat Paknam Bhasicharoen.

Asia

Japan 
Wat Paknam Japan

Oceania

New Zealand 
Wat Paknam New Zealand

North America

Ohio 
Wat Paknam America

Michigan 
Wat Paknam Michigan

Pennsylvania 
Wat Mongkoltepmunee

Wat Phra Dhammakaya 
Wat Phra Dhammakaya (RTGS: Wat Phra Thammakai) is a Buddhist temple (wat) in Khlong Luang District, in the peri-urban Pathum Thani Province north of Bangkok, Thailand. It was founded in 1970 by the maechi (nun) Chandra Khonnokyoong and monk Luang Por Dhammajayo. It is the best-known and the fastest growing temple of the Dhammakaya tradition. The temple emphasizes the revival of traditional Buddhist values, doing so through modern methods and technology.

Below is a list of international branches belonging to Wat Phra Dhammakaya.

Europe

Austria 
 Wat Buddha Austria
 Wat Buddha Vienna

Belgium 
 Wat Phra Dhammakaya Benelux

Denmark 
 Wat Phra Dhammakaya Denmark 
 Wat Phra Dhammakaya Korsor Lystskov

France 
 Wat Phra Dhammakaya Bordeaux 
 Wat Phra Dhammakaya Paris 
 Wat Bouddha Toulouse

Germany 
 Wat Phra Dhammakaya Bavaria
 Wat Phra Dhammakaya Berlin
 Wat Buddha Hamburg 
 Wat Phra Dhammakaya Frankfurt 
 Wat Phra Dhammakaya Schwarzwald 
 Wat Buddha Heilbronn 
 Wat Buddha Nordrhein Westfalen

Italy 
 Wat Phra Dhammakaya Italy

Malta 
 Wat Buddha Malta

Netherlands

Norway 
 Wat Phra Dhammakaya Norway

Sweden 
 Wat Phra Dhammakaya Boras 
 Wat Buddha Stockholm

Switzerland 
 Wat Phra Dhammakaya Switzerland

United Kingdom 

 Wat Phra Dhammakaya London 
 Wat Phra Dhammakaya Manchester
 Wat Buddha Newcastle 
 Meditation Center of Scotland

Canada 
 Dhammakaya International Meditation Society of British Columbia 
 Centre Meditation Dhammakaya de Montreal

United States

Massachusetts 
 Dhammakaya Meditation Center Boston

California 
 Dhammakaya International Meditation Center, Azusa
 Dhammakaya Meditation Center Silicon Valley

Florida 
 Palm Beach Meditation Center
 Florida Meditation Center

Illinois 
 Meditation Center of Chicago

Georgia 
 Georgia Meditation Center

Minnesota 
 Minnesota Meditation Center

Kansas 
 Dhammakaya International Meditation Center Kansas

New Jersey 
 Dhammakaya International Meditation Center of New Jersey

Oregon 
 Oregon Meditation Center

Washington 
 Seattle Meditation Center

Texas 
 Meditation Center of Texas

Washington D.C. 
 Meditation Center of D.C.

Tennessee 
 Dhammakaya Meditation Center Tennessee

Denver 
 Dhammakaya International Meditation Center Denver

Asia

Brunei 
 Brunei Meditation Center

People's Republic of China 
 Wat Phra Dhammakaya Kowloon
 Wat Phra Dhammakaya Hong Kong
 Dhammakaya Coordination Center Shanghai China
 Kunming Dhammakaya Co-ordination Center
 Beijing Meditation Center

Indonesia 
 Meditation Center of Indonesia

Japan 
 Wat Phra Dhammakaya Ibaraki
 Wat Phra Dhammakaya Kanagawa
 Wat Phra Dhammakaya Nagano
 Wat Phra Dhammakaya Osaka
 Wat Phra Dhammakaya Saitama
 Wat Phra Dhammakaya Tokyo
 Wat Phra Dhammakaya Tochigi
 Wat Phra Dhammakaya Yamanashi
 Wat Phra Dhammakaya Aichi
 Wat Phra Dhammakaya Gunma
 Thai Bukkyo Meisou Center

Malaysia 
 Dhammakaya Meditation Association of Selangor
 Dhammakaya Meditation Center of Penang

Mongolia 
 Dhammakaya Meditation Center of Mongolia

Nepal 
 Dhammakaya Meditation Center of Nepal

The Philippines 
 The Middle Way Meditation Institute

Singapore 
 Dhammakaya Centre Singapore

South Korea 
 Wat Bhavana Yangju

Taiwan 
 Wat Phra Dhammakaya Taipei 
 Wat Bhavana Taizhong 
 Wat Phra Dhammakaya Taoyuan 
 Dhammakaya International Meditation Center of Gaoxiong (Taiwan)

Oceania

Australia 
 Wat Phra Dhammakaya Brisbane 
 Wat Phra Dhammakaya Melbourne 
 Wat Phra Dhammakaya WA
 Wat Phra Dhammakaya Sydney 
 Dhammakaya Meditation Centre, Albury

New Zealand 
 Wat Phra Dhammakaya Dunedin
 Wat Phra Dhammakaya Auckland 
 Wellington Meditation Centre

Solomon Islands 
 Solomon Islands Meditation Center

Africa and Middle East

South Africa 
 The Johannesburg Meditation Center

Bahrain 
 Bahrain Meditation Center

Oman 
 Oman Meditation Center

United Arab Emirates 
 Dubai Meditation Centre (United Arab Emirates)

References 

Buddhism in Africa
Buddhism in the United States
Buddhism in Europe
Buddhism in Asia
Dhammakaya tradition